Taj Mahal Hotel may refer to:

Taj Mahal Hotel, Abids, Hyderabad, India
Taj Mahal Palace Hotel, Mumbai, India
Trump Taj Mahal, now the Hard Rock Hotel & Casino Atlantic City, New Jersey, US